Limestone is a village in Limestone Township, Kankakee County, Illinois, United States. It was incorporated in 2006 and had a population of 1,598 at the 2010 census.

The village is part of the Kankakee–Bradley Metropolitan Statistical Area, which comprises all of Kankakee County.

Geography

Demographics

In 2010, Limestone had a population of 1,598.  The population was 94.8% non-Hispanic white, 0.5% black, 0.6% Asian, 0.1% non-Hispanic of some other race, 1.6% from two or more races and 2.9% Hispanic or Latino.

References

External links
Official website

Villages in Kankakee County, Illinois
Villages in Illinois
Populated places established in 2006